, also known as , was a Japanese empress, the chief consort of Emperor Saga and the daughter of .
 
The empress was a devout Buddhist. She founded the Buddhist Danrin-ji temple complex, and for this reason, she came to be called Danrin-kōgō.

She died in the 4th day of the 5th month of 850.

Genealogy
Lady Kachiko was born to Tachibana no Kiyotomo and his wife, Taguchi Michihime.

In June 809, Tachibana no Kachiko married the new emperor. The marriage produced seven children: two sons and five daughters. Her eldest son would succeed his father as Emperor of Japan and her eldest daughter married Prince Otomo, who later became Emperor Junna.

Husband: Emperor Saga (嵯峨天皇, Saga-tennō, October 3, 786 – August 24, 842)  
Son: Imperial Prince Masara (正良親王) later Emperor Ninmyō
Daughter: Imperial Princess Seishi (正子内親王; 810–879), married to Emperor Junna
Daughter: Imperial Princess Hideko (秀子内親王; d. 850)
Son: Imperial Prince Hidera (秀良親王; 817–895)
Daughter: Imperial Princess Toshiko (俊子内親王; d. 826)
Daughter: Imperial Princess Yoshiko (芳子内親王; d. 836)
Daughter: Imperial Princess Shigeko (繁子内親王; d. 865)

In popular culture
In the acclaimed 2013 movie Avalokitesvara, a loose adaptation of the Putuoshan genesis story, Ryoko Nakano starred as the Empress Dowager Tachibana Kachiko.

Notes

References
Adolphson, Mikael S., Edward Kamens and Stacie Matsumoto. (2006).  Heian Japan, Centers and Peripheries. Honolulu: University of Hawaii Press. ; OCLC 71542885
 Kōjien, 6th edition
 Ponsonby-Fane, Richard Arthur Brabazon. (1959).  The Imperial House of Japan. Kyoto: Ponsonby Memorial Society. OCLC 194887

786 births
850 deaths
Japanese empresses
Deified Japanese people
Japanese Buddhist nuns
8th-century Buddhists
9th-century Buddhists
8th-century Japanese women
9th-century Japanese women